Congewai Creek, a watercourse of the Hunter River catchment, is located in the Hunter district of New South Wales, Australia.

Course
The river flows generally west by south, then north by west, then northwest by north, then west by north, then west southwest, and then south, joined by four tributaries including the Cedar Creek, before reaching its confluence with the Wollombi Brook near . The river descends  over its  course.

See also

 List of rivers of Australia
 List of rivers of New South Wales (A-K)
 Rivers of New South Wales

References

External links
 

 

Rivers of the Hunter Region